The Royal Norwegian Society of Sciences and Letters (DKNVS) is a Norwegian learned society based in Trondheim. It was founded in 1760 and is Norway's oldest scientific and scholarly institution. The society's Protector is King Harald V of Norway. Its membership consists of no more than 435 members elected for life among the country's most prominent scholars and scientists.

The society’s Danish name predates both written standards for Norwegian and has remained unchanged after Norway’s independence from Denmark in 1814 and the spelling reforms of the 20th century.

History
DKNVS was founded in 1760 by the bishop of Nidaros Johan Ernst Gunnerus, headmaster at the Trondheim Cathedral School Gerhard Schøning and Councillor of State Peter Frederik Suhm under the name Det Trondhiemske Selskab (the Trondheim Society). From 1761 it published academic papers in a series titled Skrifter. It was the northernmost learned society in the world, and was established in a time when Norway did not have universities or colleges.

It received the royal affirmation of its statutes on 17 July 1767, and was given its present name at a ceremony on 29 January 1788, king Christian VII of Denmark's birthday. In 1771, when Johann Friedrich Struensee took over the de facto rule of Denmark-Norway, Johan Ernst Gunnerus was summoned to Copenhagen, where he was given the mission to establish a university in Norway. Gunnerus did not suggest that the university be established in Trondhjem, but in southern Christianssand (Kristiansand), due to its proximity to Jutland. If this happened, he would have the Society of Sciences and Letters moved to Christianssand, to correspond with the new university. However, the plan was never carried out. Struensee's reign ended in 1772, but he reportedly dismissed the plan before this. (Kristiansand got its university in 2007.)

The society was housed in the premises of Trondheim Cathedral School until 1866, when it acquired its own localities. Since 1903 its main task was to run a museum. In 1926 there was a split in which the museum became a separate entity, receiving the assets of the learned society. Also in 1926, another publication series Det Kongelige Norske Videnskabers Selskab Forhandlinger was inaugurated. Ownership of the museum was transferred to the University of Trondheim in 1968, today the Norwegian University of Science and Technology, but DKNVS re-received some assets in a 1984 reorganization, and now controls these assets through the foundation DKNVSS.

A history of the Royal Norwegian Society of Sciences and Letters was written in 1960 by Hans Midbøe, and released in two volumes.

In connection with the 250th anniversary of the Society, Håkon With Andersen, Brita Brenna, Magne Njåstad, and Astrid Wale wrote an updated history.
Also, Arild Stubhaug wrote a shorter history, prepared for a general audience.

Organisation
The board of directors consists of seven people, five men and two women. It is led by praeses Steinar Supphellen and vice-praeses Kristian Fossheim. Other board members are Hanna Mustaparta, Britt Dale, Ola Dale, Joar Grimsbu and Asbjørn Moen. The daily administration is led by a secretary-general; Kristian Overskaug. The board is responsible for awarding the Gunnerus Medal for academic achievement. The medal was inaugurated in 1927.

Before 1815, the sitting King held the title of praeses, while the highest-ranked non-royal member was vice praeses. In the tradition of Gunnerus the bishop, the latter post was filled by clerics until 1820, when Christian Krohg took the seat. From 1815 the King holds the title of "protector". Today King Harald V of Norway is protector of the society.

Members of the learned society are divided into two divisions, Letters and Sciences. In 2005 there were 470 members, of whom 134 were foreign. This is a marked increase from 1996, when it had 399 members, of whom 94 were foreign.

Awards 
The society awards the following prizes:

Gunnerus Sustainability Science Award 
The Gunnerus Sustainability Science Award is the society's highest award. It is awarded for outstanding scientific work that promotes sustainable development globally. As of 2017 the prize is awarded by DKNVS in collaboration with the Norwegian University of Science and Technology.
 
The award was established in 2012, as a cooperation between DKNVS, Sparebanken Midt-Norge and the foundation Technoport. It is named after the Norwegian scientist and bishop Johan Ernst Gunnerus, and consists of a cash award of 1,000,000 Norwegian kroner.

The first laureate was announced in February 2012, and the prize was handed over the 17 April in Olavshallen in Trondheim, Norway during the conference Technoport 2012.

Laureates are:
 2017: The ecologist Carl Folke.
 2012: The biologist Kamal Bawa for his pioneering work on population biology in rainforest areas.

The Royal Norwegian Society of Sciences and Letters annual prize for young researchers

This award is funded by I. K. Lykke. The prize is awarded annually to two people under 40 years who are "Norwegian researchers or foreign researchers at the Norwegian research institutions that have demonstrated outstanding talent, originality and effort, and who have achieved excellent results in their fields". 

Awardees are:
 2018 Marie Elisabeth Rognes (science) and Trond Nordfjærn (humanities)
 2017 David Bassett (science) and Mats Ingulstad (humanities)
 2016 Jannike Solsvik (science) and Siv Gøril Brandtzæg (humanities) 
 2015 Steffen Oppermann (science) and Ivar Berg (humanities)
 2014 Andriy Bondarenko (science) and Terje Lohndal (humanities)
 2013 Yasser Roudi (science) and Theresa M. Olasveengen (science)
 2012 Sverre Magnus Selbach (science) and Martin Wåhlberg (humanities)
 2011 Simen Ådnøy Ellingsen (science) and Thomas Hegghammer (humanities) 
 2010 Petter Andreas Bergh (science), Jacob Linder (science) and Jon Hernes Fiva (humanities) 
 2009 Xavier Raynaud (science) and Terje Andreas Eikemo (humanities)  
 2008 Jill Kristin Lautgeb (science) and Jo Jakobsen (humanities) 
 2007 Marit Sletmoen (science)
 2006 Marianne Fyhn (science), Torkel Hafting Fyhn (science) and Halvard Buhaug, (humanities) 
 2005 Sigurd Einum (science) and Dag Trygve Truslew Haug (humanities)  
 2004 Bård Gunnar Stokke (science) and Anne Beate Maurseth (humanities) 
 2003 Sigurd Weidemann Løvseth (science) and Cathrine Brun (humanities)  
 2002 Alexander Øhrn (science) and Tanja Ellingsenand (humanities)   
 2001 Magne Lygren (science) and Marianne Ryghaug (humanities)   
 2000 Ørjan Johansen (science) and Toril Aalberg (humanities)   
 1999 Baard Kasa (science) and Kaja Borthen (humanities)

The Royal Norwegian Society of Sciences and Letters scientific annual prize 

 2002 Johannes Skaar and Jarle Tufto
 2001 Jonathan W. Moses and Erlend Rønnekleiv
 2000 Rolf Hobson 
 1999 May-Britt Moser and Edvard Moser
 1998 Jarle André Haugan 
 1997 Magne Sætersdal and Baard Pedersen 
 1996 Stig Arild Slørdahl and Geir Johnsen
 1995 Jon Thomas Kringlebotn and Tor Grande
 1993 Tor Anders Åfarli and Halvor Kjørholt 
 1992 Øyvind Solberg and Eirik Helseth 
 1991 Tore C. Stiles and Jarle Hjelen
 1990 Yngvar Olsen and Karin Gjøl Hagen
 1989 Arne Sandvik and Bernt-Erik Saether 
 1988 Dagfinn Berntzen and Berit Kjeldstad
 1987 Håkon With Andersen and Randi  Eidsmo Reinertsen
 1986 Lisa Jacobsen and Jarle Mork 
 1985 Jan Ragnar Hagland, Eivin Røskaft and Trond E. Ellingsen
 1984 Linda R. White and Terje Espevik

Heads of the society
This is a list of the heads of the Royal Norwegian Society of Sciences and Letters:

Protector (praeses until 1815)
1772–1805: Crown Prince Frederik of Denmark-Norway
1805–1814: Crown Prince Christian Frederick of Denmark-Norway
1814–1815: vacant
1815–1818: Crown Prince Charles III John of Norway and Sweden
1818–1859: Oscar I of Norway and Sweden
1859–1872: Charles IV of Norway and Sweden
1872–1905: Oscar II of Norway and Sweden
1906–1957: Haakon VII of Norway
1957–1991: Olav V of Norway
1991–present: Harald V of Norway

Praeses (vice praeses until 1815)
1766–1773: Johan Ernst Gunnerus
1773–1780: Ole Irgens
1780–1791: Christian Frederik Hagerup
1791–1803: Johan Christian Schønheyder
1804–1820: Peter Olivarius Bugge
1820–1828: Christian Krohg
1829–1832: Niels Stockfleth Schultz
1832–1832: Frederik Christoffer, greve af Trampe
1833–1838: Christian Hersleb Hornemann
1838–1851: Frederik Moltke Bugge
1851–1855: Hans Jørgen Darre
1855–1865: Christian Petersen
1865–1870: Andreas Grimelund
1870–1872: Hans Jørgen Darre
1872–1874: Andreas Grimelund
1874–1883: Bernhard Ludvig Essendrop
1883–1897: Karl Ditlev Rygh
1897–1899: Johannes Sejersted
1899–1902: Knud H. Lossius
1903–1914: Bjarne Lysholm
1914–1926: Axel Sommerfelt
1926–1933: Halfdan Bryn
1933–1945: Ragnvald Iversen
1946–1946: Viggo Brun
1946–1949: Ragnvald Iversen
1950–1958: Thorolf Vogt
1958–1965: Harald Wergeland
1966–1973: Tord Godal
1974–1981: Sigmund Selberg
1982–1989: Grethe Authén Blom
1990–1995: Haakon Olsen
1996–1999: Peder Borgen
2000–2004: Karsten Jakobsen
2005–2010: Steinar Supphellen
2010–2013: Kristian Fossheim
2013–2013: Jan Ragnar Hagland
2014–2016: Helge Holden
2017-2019: Ida Bull
2020-present May Thorseth

See also
Norwegian Academy of Science and Letters, another Norwegian learned society

References

External links
Official website

 
1760 establishments in Norway
Norwegian awards
Science and technology awards
Organizations established in 1760
Learned societies of Norway